The Terpezița is a left tributary of the river Desnățui in Romania. It discharges into the Desnățui near Vârvor.

References

Rivers of Romania
Rivers of Dolj County